Rogers Hornsby Wright (January 27, 1927 – March 31, 2013) was an American psychologist and writer. He was known as the "Father of Professional Psychology" for his work aimed at improving the recognition of professional psychology as a psychological specialty. He was the co-founder and first president of the Committee for the Advancement of Psychological Professions and Sciences, and he received the American Psychological Association's Award for Distinguished Contributions to Applied Psychology as a Professional Practice in 1985. He served as president of the American Psychological Association's Division 12 (the Society of Clinical Psychology) in 1988.

References

1927 births
2013 deaths
20th-century American psychologists
People from Lawrence County, Arkansas
Northwestern University alumni
American clinical psychologists